What Is the Electric Car? is a 2010 documentary film that explains the benefits of electric cars. Directed by  Ken Grant and Scott DuPont, and the film features several actors, scientists, engineers and activists, all of whom contribute their thoughts and explanations regarding electric cars and electric vehicle technology.

The film premiered on December 14, 2010 at the Egyptian Theatre in Hollywood, California. One reviewer stated that the movie "teeters on the brink of tedious but repeatedly saves itself with moments of cleverness or insight."

References

External links
 
 

2010 films
2010 in the environment
American documentary films
2010 documentary films
Documentary films about environmental issues
Documentary films about automobiles
Electric vehicles
Documentary films about conspiracy theories
2010s English-language films
2010s American films